Muriel Ross Abdurahman (April 29, 1938 – December 22, 2013) was a politician from Alberta, Canada. She served in the Legislative Assembly of Alberta from 1993 to 1997.

Political career

Fort Saskatchewan Town Council
Abdurahman was elected to Fort Saskatchewan town council in 1977.  She was elected Mayor of Fort Saskatchewan in 1980 and 1983, and was the first Mayor of the City of Fort Saskatchewan following its incorporation as a city in 1985. Abdurahman resigned midway through her second term as mayor in order to contest the 1986 Alberta general election.

Provincial Politics
Abdurahman first ran for the Alberta Legislature in the 1986 general election.  Running in the electoral district of Clover Bar under the Progressive Conservative banner, she finished a distant second to incumbent Representative Party MLA Walt Buck. She ran as a Liberal candidate in the 1993 general election in the new electoral district of Clover Bar-Fort Saskatchewan and defeated incumbent independent MLA Kurt Gesell. In the 1997 Alberta general election she earned a greater share of the popular vote than in 1993 but was defeated by Progressive Conservative candidate Rob Lougheed.

References

External links
Legislative Assembly of Alberta Members Listing
 https://fortsaskonline.com/local/historical-society-tells-story-of-fort-saskatchewan-s-first-female-mayor

 

1938 births
2013 deaths
Alberta Liberal Party MLAs
Women MLAs in Alberta
Mayors of Fort Saskatchewan
Women mayors of places in Alberta
20th-century Canadian politicians